Margareta Arvay (born 1 October 1937) is a Romanian cross-country skier. She competed in the women's 10 kilometres at the 1956 Winter Olympics.

References

External links
 

1937 births
Living people
Romanian female cross-country skiers
Olympic cross-country skiers of Romania
Cross-country skiers at the 1956 Winter Olympics
People from Timiș County